The 2007 East Riding of Yorkshire Council election took place on 3 May 2007 to elect members of East Riding of Yorkshire Council in England. This was on the same day as other local elections.

The Conservative Party gained a majority of seats, including those of the Liberal Democrats and Labour Party leaders.

Results

References

2007 English local elections
2007
2000s in the East Riding of Yorkshire